Acantholytoceras is an extinct genus of cephalopod belonging to the ammonite subclass.

References 

Ammonitida genera
Crioceratitidae
Cretaceous ammonites of Europe